Tear the World Down is the first and only album released by the hard rock band We Are the Fallen. It was released in the United Kingdom on May 10, 2010 and the United States on May 11, 2010 under the Universal Republic record label. It includes their first single "Bury Me Alive".  The album debuted on the Billboard 200 at No. 33, selling 13,000 for the week.  It has sold 41,000 copies as of September 2010.

Critical reception 
Andy Greenwald Entertainment Weekly gave the album a B–, writing: "Smithson’s voice shines over Moody’s familiar stew of metal riffs and gothy strings. Too bad the subject matter seems cribbed from a teen's Tumblr." Stephen Thomas Erlewine of AllMusic rated the album 3 out of 5 stars, stating that the group sounds exactly like Fallen-era sans "the sour charisma of Amy Lee" and the "genuine" musical tension Lee and Moody had. Singer Carly's presence "steers [the album] toward pure product, but that was the intention" and the record would "please those who like the sound of Fallen but could do without all the sulkiness." Faye Lewis of Rock Sound rated it 8 out of 10 stars, opining that it is "familiar terrain revisited" but the songs show "the bite of a band with something to prove" and the band "rock harder than Evanescence ever could." Kirsten Coachman of Seattle Post-Intelligencer said that "the main issue with the album and the band is that they don't seem to have developed an identity of their own, yet", lacking authenticity in the music or a "sound that would set them apart". However, some songs indicate "there is potential for this band to set itself apart and stand on its own." Trey Willie Sputnikmusic gave the album a "poor" rating of 2 out of 5 stars, writing that it "sounds old and tired" in its Fallen likeness and "without the strong songwriting" of Fallen. The riffs "lack any real identity or true variation", the "symphonic elements feel as if their inclusion was an afterthought", and "the melodic sections ... are either too weak or too brief to make a real impact", concluding that "absolutely no effort was made to do more than cash in on Evanescence fans' nostalgia for a seven year old album."

The album's musical style was regarded as hard rock and nu metal.

Track listing 

B-Sides
 "Samhain" - 4:07
 "Like a Prayer" - 4:11

Personnel 
We Are the Fallen
 Carly Smithson – vocals
 Ben Moody – lead guitar, programming, piano, percussion
 John LeCompt – rhythm guitar, mandolin, programming
 Marty O'Brien – bass
 Rocky Gray – drums

Additional musicians
 Jeremiah Gray – percussion
 Daniel Moody – piano, B3
 David Hodges – piano
 Phillip Peterson – Cello, strings on "I Am Only One"
 Bethanie and John "J.C." LeCompt II – additional choir vocals on "Burn"
 David Campbell – string and choir arrangement

Charts

Release history

References

External links 
 

2010 debut albums
We Are the Fallen albums
Republic Records albums